Home in Sulphur Springs is the debut album of American guitarist Norman Blake, released in 1972. The album was reissued by Rounder records with the title incorrectly printed as Back Home in Sulphur Springs.

Reception

In his Allmusic review, critic Jim Smith wrote "this record is among Blake's best, demonstrating his nearly incomparable virtuosity, easygoing style, and broad repertoire..."

Track listing 
 "Little Joe" (Traditional) – 2:49
 "Richland Avenue Rag" (Norman Blake) – 1:57
 "When the Fields Are White With Daisies" (Blake) – 2:48
 "Cattle in the Cane" (Traditional) – 2:12
 "Crossing No. 9" (Blake) – 2:47
 "Weave and Way" (Blake, Tut Taylor, Traditional) – 2:24
 "Ginseng Sullivan" (Blake) – 3:31
 "Bringing in the Georgia Mail" (Traditional) – 2:30
 "Bully of the Town" (Traditional) – 2:03
 "Randall Collins" (Blake) – 1:55
 "Done Gone" (Traditional) – 1:39
 "Down Home Summertime Blues" (Blake) – 3:42
 "Warp Factor No. 9" (Blake) – 3:38
 "Orphan Annie" (Blake) – 2:56
 "Spanish Fandango" (Traditional) – 3:48

Personnel 
 Norman Blake – guitar, mandolin, vocals
 Tut Taylor – dobro
Production notes
 Produced by Norman Blake and Tut Taylor
 Claude J. Hill – mixing
 Slick Lawson – photography
 Michael Melford – liner notes, executive producer

References 

1972 debut albums
Norman Blake (American musician) albums
Rounder Records albums